PR1 may refer to:
 Polskie Radio Program I, a radio channel broadcast by the Polish public broadcaster Polskie Radio
 the first group of plant pathogenesis-related proteins
 the first of three categories of para-rowing, also known as adaptive rowing
 VR Class Pr1, a Finnish locomotive

PR-1 may refer to:
 Puerto Rico Highway 1, a road connecting the city of Ponce to San Juan